Presidency Division is an administrative division within the Indian state of West Bengal. The headquarters and the largest city of the Presidency division is Kolkata, the state capital. Presidency division is bounded by Medinipur division to South-West, Burdwan division to North-West and Malda division to North. The whole east side of the division is covered by  Bangladesh–India border.

Geography

Districts
It consists of 5 districts:

Demographics
According to 2011 Census of India Presidency Division has a population of 32,741,224 roughly equal to the nation of Malaysia and the US state of California.
With a population of about 33 million. It's the most populous country second level division of the world as well as the most populous division of India and West Bengal.

Religion

Hindus form the majority of the population. Muslims form the largest minority in this division. They are mainly concentrated in Basirhat subdivision of Uttar 24 Pargana district, Tehatta subdivision and Krishnanagar Sadar subdivision of Nadia district and Diamond Harbour subdivision and Baruipur subdivision of Dakshin 24 Pargana district.

References

Divisions of West Bengal
Western Bengal